Cris Tales (stylized as CrisTales) is a role-playing video game developed by Colombian indie game studios Dreams Uncorporated and Syck, and published by Modus Games. It was released for Google Stadia, Microsoft Windows, Nintendo Switch, PlayStation 4, PlayStation 5, Xbox One, and Xbox Series X/S on July 20, 2021.

Gameplay 

The game is a turn-based RPG, along with the ability to time jump, both on the map and in-battle, affecting the gameplay. Each playable character has their own unique abilities.

The primary game mechanic consists on the manipulation of time. The screen is split into three sections, showing the present in the center, the past on the left, and the future on the right. During the story, Crisbell must complete a series of missions with the help of Matias, where she must use her time powers to learn from the past and use it to save the present thus creating a brighter future. But tread lightly, your choices will have consequences which could affect the people you meet and interact with which could alter their lives and futures as well.

In battle, Crisbell can summon the crystal powers to send enemies to the past or the future, altering their characteristics, in which the player can use it to take advantage but sometimes it makes your enemies stronger or return them to their prime so use it wisely. The battles are carried out using commands to select attacks, skills, or items, in addition to making the precise pressing of buttons during attacks, allowing doing more damage to enemies or receive less damage.

In addition to the main story, the demo includes a Colosseum mode, where the player faces a horde of enemies, in order to test their skills.

Plot 

Crisbell is an orphan girl who lives in the Narim orphanage. While she picked up a rose for Mother Superior, it is snatched from her by Matias, a talking frog, whom she follows to Narim Cathedral (inspired in the Las Lajas Shrine), in order to unleash her powers. After the events, Matias asks Crisbell to accompany him to visit his friend Willhelm, a time mage, who explains more about her powers.

Later, Crisbell is commended in a series of missions, until she finds the village farm in flames and invaded by goblins under the command of the Empress of Time, whose aim is to take over the Crystallis Kingdom. To avoid a disastrous future, Crisbell returns to Willhelm to ask for help, and he tells her about the Sword. Crisbell is determined to use the powers of the Sword, becoming a time mage herself.

With the Sword in hand, she returns to the farm to battle the goblins. During the battle, Cristopher, an elemental mage warrior who has been fighting the goblins, joins her. After a couple of battles, they are faced by the Empress of Time's minions, the Volcano Sisters. Crisbell must use the power of the time crystals to help defeat them. After receiving several attacks, the sisters retreat.

Development 
The game is being developed by the indie Colombian studio Dreams Uncorporated. It was officially announced at E3 2019, which was claimed as a tribute to classic JRPGs like Final Fantasy, Chrono Trigger and Persona, among other franchises. Its launch was scheduled for November 2020, but was postponed to early 2021, in order to bring a better product.

In addition to the influences of the JRPGs, Cris Tales shows influences from Colombian culture and architecture.

Reception 

During its development within early release gameplays streams, Cris Tales received critical acclaim by specialized media. Hardcore Gamer cited it as "an unmissable, gorgeous manipulation of time" and nominated it as the Game of Show and Best RPG at E3 2019. Tom Marks from IGN claims that Cris Tales "looks a bit like Paper Mario with Persona 5s UI", praising the concept, the hand-drawn graphics, and the time jump-based gameplay.

After its release, Cris Tales received "mixed or average reviews" on Metacritic, with an aggregated score of 74/100 for the PC version based on 29 reviews. Nintendo Life praised the premise for taking the classic JRPGs in gameplay ideas and art style, but criticized some aspects of the combat, calling it "frustrating", giving it a 8/10 for the Nintendo Switch version. IGN praised the cast and the art, but criticised the gameplay, citing it as "a clever time-traveling JRPG that’s held back by monotonous combat", giving it a "Good" score of 7/10 for all platforms. A less favorable review came from PC Gamer, which cited it as "a striking RPG that fails to deliver on its temporal premise", giving it a 57/100 for the PC version.

The local media rated the game a 7.5/10 and said, "Cris Tales is a game with an excellent premise, but one that has lagged behind remembering the past."

Notes

References

External links 
 Official website

2021 video games
Role-playing video games
Video games developed in Colombia
PlayStation 4 games
PlayStation 5 games
Single-player video games
Windows games
Nintendo Switch games
Xbox Series X and Series S games
Xbox One games
Stadia games
Indie video games